Silviu Ilie (born 27 June 1988) is a Romanian footballer who plays as a left-winger.

Ilie made his debut for the Romania national team at the age of 22 in 2010 in a friendly game against Italy played in Klagenfurt.

Honours

FC Oțelul Galați
Liga I: 2010–11

External links
Profile at fcotelulgalati.info 
Profile at otelul-galati.ro 

1988 births
Living people
Sportspeople from Galați
Romanian footballers
Association football defenders
Association football midfielders
Liga I players
Liga II players
ASC Oțelul Galați players
FCM Dunărea Galați players
ASA 2013 Târgu Mureș players
FCV Farul Constanța players
FC Dunărea Călărași players
Romania international footballers